Wilderspool Stadium was a rugby league stadium in Warrington, England. The ground was Warrington RLFC's old ground before moving to the Halliwell Jones Stadium.

History

In 1898, Warrington RLFC moved to the Wilderspool Stadium. A 10-year lease was agreed with Greenall Whitley for land on the east side of their previous ground, a pitch previously used by Latchford Rovers Rugby Club. Warrington's previous pitch was used to build houses in Fletcher Street.

Wilderspool Stadium was modernised and extended in the inter-war period, becoming one of the finest venues in rugby league, and being awarded host status for Championship finals, Challenge Cup semi-finals, and tour games. A new west perimeter wall and turnstiles were built at Wilderspool around 1921. In 1925 the supporters' club provided Warrington with covered accommodation on the popular side of the ground and two years later, they donated a scoreboard.
In 1926, the perimeter wooden fence being replaced by a concrete wall. New dressing rooms underneath the main stand were opened in January 1934.

Wilderspool's record attendance was created in the 1948-9 season when 34,304 spectators turned up to see Warrington lose only their second game of the season to Wigan.

During the Second World War, Wilderspool was requisitioned for the war effort; being used as a storage depot.

In April, 1953, Wilderspool staged its first international, a match between Wales and Other Nationalities. 

In 1958, the popular side terracing became fully covered and soon after the Fletcher Street End was given a roof.

In 1965, floodlights were installed at Wilderspool.

A stand was completely destroyed by arson in 1982. The Brian Bevan stand was built in 1983 to replace the one lost to arson.

During the 1994 Kangaroo tour, Australia defeated Warrington 24-0 at Wilderspool before a crowd of 11,244 in the Kangaroos' last game at the ground. The record Kangaroo Tour attendance at the stadium was on the 1948-9 tour when 26,879 saw Warrington defeat the Kangaroos 16-7.

Warrington RLFC left Wilderspool for the Halliwell Jones Stadium in 2003. The final game was played in September 2003 with Warrington beating Wakefield 52–12.

The stadium was finally demolished between August and October 2014. A plan for 160 houses on the site was submitted in 2019, more than 16 years after the final game at Wilderspool. 

The scoreboard from Wilderspool was restored and placed in Warrington's Victoria Park in 2017.

Rugby League Test matches
List of Test and World Cup matches played at Wilderspool Stadium.

Rugby League Tour Matches
Wilderspool also saw Warrington and the county team Lancashire play host to various international touring teams from 1907–1994.

References

Buildings and structures in Warrington
Sports venues in Cheshire
Warrington Wolves
Rugby League World Cup stadiums
Defunct rugby league venues in England
Sport in Warrington
1881 establishments in England
2014 disestablishments in England
Sports venues completed in 1881
Sports venues demolished in 2014